Rudolf Stämpfli (born 3 August 1955, in Bern, Switzerland) is a Swiss entrepreneur of the graphic arts industry and publisher. Together with his brother Peter Stämpfli since 1988, he has run the sixth generation of the family business Stämpfli AG in Bern.

Life 
Stämpfli spent his school time in Bern. From 1977 to 1982, Rudolf Stämpfli studied business administration and operations research at the University of St. Gallen (HSG). In 1985, through his doctoral thesis on the calculation in the graphic arts industry he received his oec. HSG doctorate. In 1998, Stämpfli completed further education at the Stanford Graduate School of Business in California. At the "dies academicus" in December 2014, the Faculty of Economics and Social Sciences of the University of Bern awarded him an honorary doctorate.

In 1984 he joined the family business, Stämpfli AG in Bern, and in 1988 he took over the company together with his brother Peter Stämpfli. Today he is President of the board of directors and publisher of Stämpfli Verlag AG. He is also President of the Board of Directors of BLS AG in Bern and since 2013 Vice President of the Board of Mobiliar Holding AG.

From 28 June 2003 until 1 July 2011 he was President of the Swiss Employers Association. In addition, Stämpfli engaged in the Burgergemeinde Bern, acting as its vice president from 2011 to mid-2016.

Awards 
 2009: 25th HIV award winner of the Canton of Bern
 2014: Dr. rer. oec. H. c. awarded by the University of Bern

External links 
 Website of Stämpfli AG
 Rudolf Stämpfli on the website BLS AG
 Rudolf Stämpfli on the website Mobiliar

References 

20th-century Swiss businesspeople
21st-century Swiss businesspeople
20th-century publishers (people)
21st-century publishers (people)
People from the canton of Bern
People from Bern
1955 births
University of St. Gallen alumni
Stanford Graduate School of Business alumni
Living people